Butterfly is the sixteenth studio album by Japanese pop band Deen. It was released on 1 June 2016 under the Epic Records Japan label.

Background

This album doesn't consist of any single. The single Zutto Tsutaekatta I love you didn't make it in this album, instead it will be included in their seventeenth studio album Parade which released in August 2017.

According to official website, it's the continuation of their studio album Crawl as the Summer Special Album Vol.2.

This album includes completely new tracks with several tracks of their big hits such as Hitori Janai, Smile Blue and coconuts feat.kokomo with completely new arrangement of the summer feeling.

Shinji and Kouji in this album performs their own original songs Climb High and Walking on Sunshine. The album includes as well the covers of Yumi Matsutoya's song Mannatsu no Yoru no Yume and The Boom's song Kaze ni Naritai.

This album was released in three formats: regular CD edition and limited A/B CD+DVD edition. The limited A edition includes DVD footage of their live performance  Deen Live Joy - Break19 ~Zenkai Koigokoro!!~. The limited B edition includes CD with seven live recordings from their live performance Deen AOR Night Cruisin' ~3rd Groove~

Charting
The album reached #23 in its first week and charted for 3 weeks, selling 5,000+ copies.

Track listing

References

Sony Music albums
Japanese-language albums
2016 albums
Deen (band) albums